Olivella orejasmirandai is a species of small sea snail, marine gastropod mollusk in the subfamily Olivellinae, in the family Olividae, the olives.  Species in the genus Olivella are commonly called dwarf olives.

Description

Distribution

References

orejasmirandai
Gastropods described in 1986